Peter Stewart Duncan (1 July 1890 – 8 April 1974) was a Scottish professional football inside left who played in the Football League for Brentford. He also played in the Scottish League for Armadale.

Career statistics

References

1890 births
Scottish footballers
English Football League players
Brentford F.C. players
Association football inside forwards
1974 deaths
Footballers from Glasgow
People from Baillieston
Scottish expatriate sportspeople in the United States
Armadale F.C. players
Scottish Football League players